Scythris thomisioides is a moth of the family Scythrididae. It was described by Bengt Å. Bengtsson in 1997. It is found in Tunisia.

References

thomisioides
Moths described in 1997